Quiscapampa or Quiscapanca (possibly from Quechua kiska thorn, p'anqa bract, "thorn bract") is a mountain in the Chila mountain in the Andes of Peru, about  high. It is located in the Arequipa Region, Castilla Province, Choco District. Quiscapampa lies northwest of Ojeccasa and southwest of Airicoto.

References 

Mountains of Peru
Mountains of Arequipa Region